Vibert Durdy Butts is a former Guyanese soccer player best known for scoring Guyana's first-ever World Cup-qualifying goal during a 1976 match against Suriname, which helped Guyana to a 2–0 victory. In 2015, Butts was sentenced to three years in prison for possession of 46 grams of cannabis.

References

Living people
Place of birth missing (living people)
Guyanese footballers
Guyana international footballers
Cannabis in Guyana
People convicted of cannabis offenses
Association footballers not categorized by position
Sportspeople convicted of crimes
Afro-Guyanese people
Year of birth missing (living people)